RAF Beachy Head is a former Royal Air Force radar station and one of the many Chain Home Low radar stations, being situated near Beachy Head and Eastbourne in East Sussex, England.  It featured a Type 16 radar that was monitored from RAF Kenley.

RAF Beachy Head saw much activity in the Second World War covering the area from Brighton to Hastings from ten miles out to sea, but began to decline in importance in the 1950s.

ROTOR

In 1952, a ROTOR site was built, which closed in May 1958.  The Coastguard used one of the buildings.  It closed with the end of the Cold War and partly demolished in 1996.

References

External links
 Secret Britain 
 RAF website

Royal Air Force stations in East Sussex
Beach
History of East Sussex